Caymmi is a surname common in Brazil, especially associated with musician Dorival Caymmi and his family. People with the surname Caymmi include:

 Dorival Caymmi (1914-2008), Brazilian songwriter
His three children:
 Danilo Caymmi (b. 1948), Brazilian musician
 Dori Caymmi (b. 1943), Brazilian singer
 Nana Caymmi (b. 1941), Brazilian singer
His granddaughter:
Alice Caymmi (b. 1990), Brazilian singer

Italian-language surnames